Phratora americana is a species of leaf beetle in the family Chrysomelidae. It is found in North America.This species is known from Ontario, Quebec, and high elevations in the eastern United States of America. It feeds on willow species and varies in color from purple to blue or blue-green.

Subspecies
These two subspecies belong to the species Phratora americana:
 Phratora americana americana (Schaeffer, 1928) i c g
 Phratora americana canadensis Brown, 1951 i c g
Data sources: i = ITIS, c = Catalogue of Life, g = GBIF, b = Bugguide.net

References

Further reading

 
 

Chrysomelinae
Articles created by Qbugbot
Beetles described in 1928